Joyce Reynolds is the name of:

Joyce Reynolds (actress) (1924–2019), American film actress
Joyce Reynolds (classicist) (1918–2022), British classicist and academic
 Joyce K. Reynolds (1952–2015), American computer scientist